The AJI T-610 Super Pinto was a trainer aircraft developed by American Jet Industries (AJI) as a modified version of the Temco TT Pinto.

Design and development

The T-610 Super Pinto started as a 1968 conversion of the United States Navy's Temco TT Pinto two-seat jet trainer. AJI modified the aircraft for light attack by replacing the engine with the General Electric CJ610-6 turbojet engine and extending the fuselage by 10 inches. It featured a modified wing, wingtip fuel tanks, and a swept vertical stabilizer as well as provision for two underwing hardpoints. The prototype first flew on June 28, 1968. The aircraft flew very well and later improved in power three fold, with only 20 pounds more weight compared to the original design. The United States Air Force (USAF) evaluated the Super Pinto during its PAVE COIN program in 1971 but it did not receive a contract with either the USAF or Turkey. 

Consequently, the company decided to sell the whole project and struck a deal with the Philippine government, whereby AJI relinquished all rights on the Super Pinto design. In a US$1.25 million deal, the Philippine Air Force (PAF)'s Self-Reliance Development Wing bought the rights for the work drawings, patents, design, flight test data, and process sheets for the manufacture of the aircraft on November 8, 1976, as well as one U.S.-built prototype, which became the first Philippine T-610 (now known as the Calí or "hawk"), and an additional fuselage. The deal included the exclusive rights to market military and commercial versions internationally.

The second T-610 was produced locally, and both aircraft were flight tested satisfactorily in Manila, creating high expectations to build a national aircraft industry in the Philippines. They carried the numbers 44233 and 44234, which echoed U.S. Navy Pinto serials 144233 and 144234. The two aircraft differed mainly in that "233" had the one-piece canopy of the original Pinto, while "234" had a two-piece canopy. It would be logical to conclude that "44233" was originally the Navy's 144233, but there is no evidence of this. Both Navy Pintos are still existent on the American civil register and pretty much active.

The Calí program started to encounter economic problems, and after the Marcos administration collapsed, the project was shelved. The resurrection of the Calí program was considered on various occasions. In the mid-1980s, four separate versions were targeted for possible production: a single-seat light strike aircraft that could carry up to 1,600 kg of stores for COIN operations; a tandem-seat primary jet trainer; a quick change version of the trainer that could be rapidly converted as a strike aircraft; and an executive version with a wider pressurized cabin seating five passengers. At that time, the PAF foresaw the Calí as a possible replacement for no less than its Beechcraft T-34 Mentors, SIAI-Marchetti SF.260s, North American T-28D Trojans, Lockheed T-33s and even its North American F-86F Sabres, with a planned operational life of about 15 years. The commonality of the CJ610-6 engine with the country's Northrop F-5 fighter force was especially viewed as a key element.

At the 1988 Farnborough Airshow, it was announced that American company Avstar Inc., in collaboration with Shenyang Aircraft Corporation of the People's Republic of China, Pacific Marketing Consultants Inc. of San Francisco, and Plymouth Ltd. of Hong Kong, planned to revive the Super Pinto. Under the terms of "an agreement in principle" between the four parties, the Avstar T-100 Super Mustang was to be built at Shenyang under license from Plymouth, with final assembly and avionics installation taking place in the U.S., and marketed by the two U.S. companies. A prototype, powered by a General Electric J85 turbojet, was undergoing flight testing in the U.S. The General Electric J85 is a small single-shaft turbojet engine. Military versions produce up to 2,950 lbf (13.1 kN) of thrust dry; afterburning variants can reach up to 5,000 lbf (22 kN). The engine, depending upon additional equipment and specific model, weighs from 300 to 500 pounds (140 to 230 kg). In 1988; production T-100s were expected to be powered by either this engine or a Williams FJ44. The T-100 scheme came in direct contradiction with the Philippines having the exclusive rights to market the Super Pinto internationally, so the exclusivity clause might have been invalidated by Manila's not having produced any new aircraft over the past decade. By the end, nothing came of the Super Mustang project either.

As recently as 2009 a government official stated that the Super Pinto could still be produced if only to take advantage of the licensing rights that had been purchased. If produced today, the Calí could incorporate locally produced composite materials on some major components. An appeal to the private sector was made to take part in the development and manufacture of "the first Philippine jet" on a cost-sharing and profit-sharing scheme. However, the current state of that program remains unknown.

Variants
T-610 Super Pinto/Cali The first two prototypes were converted Temco TT Pintos. The second prototype was unfinished when the program was bought by the Philippine government, and completed in Manila. Two more unarmed prototypes were made thereafter.
Aeronca Model 620 Production variant, to have been built by Aeronca. A single-seat light strike aircraft; one aircraft built/converted.
Aeronca Model 630 Two-seat primary trainer variant, to have been built by Aeronca, with no provision for armament.
Aeronca Model 640-QC/T A primary 2-seater trainer with provision for armament.

Operators

 Philippine Air Force (former)

Accidents and incidents
 The first prototype was lost during an evaluation flight which led to the termination of the program.

Aircraft on display

In December 2016, five of the TT-1 Pinto series still appeared on the U.S. civil roster (one with an expired certificate), down from seven, four of them Super Pintos, in 2011.

As of late 2015, one T-610 prototype was still preserved at the Philippine Air Force Museum.

Specifications (T-610 prototype)

See also

References

External links
 American Jet Industries T-610 Super Pinto on the-blueprints.com

Aircraft manufactured in the Philippines